The Meander Dam is a concrete gravity dam across the Upper Meander River, located in northern Tasmania, Australia. The impounded reservoir is called Lake Huntsman.

Adjacent to the dam is a small conventional hydroelectric power station.

Features and location
Proposals to build a dam on the Meander River below Warners Creek date back to at least 1968. The site was cleared in preparation for dam construction during the last 1980s. In 1995 a report by engineering consultants, GHD Group, stated that the lack of a reliable water supply for irrigation in the Meander Catchment is seen as a key factor limiting potential future expansion of agricultural enterprises. The pressure on water resources in the Meander Catchment resulted in the need to limit and sometimes prohibit the extraction of water from the river during the irrigation season. In 2002, a water management plan for the catchment was under development and was expected to address environmental flow concerns through the implementation of higher minimum river flows. This increase in minimum flows would result in the need to reduce the irrigation water currently extracted from the river, which would reduce agricultural production and prevent the development of water dependent agricultural enterprises.

However, the dam faced considerable opposition. Despite being passed by two other statutory committees of the Tasmanian Parliament, the Resource Management and Planning Appeal Tribunal knocked it back on economic and environmental grounds. The Tribunal vetoed the construction of the dam because it could not determine its economic value - as estimates ranged from a loss of 600,000 to nearly 40 million - and because it would affect two threatened species the epacris plant and the spotted tail quoll. In September 2003, following intervention by the Australian Government, the project was approved.

At 100% capacity the dam wall holds back  of water.

Since completing the construction of the Meander Dam a further four pump and pipeline schemes have been built to expand the reach of the water available from the dam and deliver irrigation water to the adjoining farming districts of Caveside-Dairy Plains, Rubicon River, Quamby Brook and Hagley.

In 2008, Irrigation Tasmania installed a 215m long floating safety barrier, to protect recreational users from the hazards of the overflow spillway.

Power plant
The Meander Dam, which creates Huntsman Lake and supplies the power station with water was completed in November 2007. The power station was commissioned in February 2008 by Tyco Tamar. Electric power generation is a by-product of water released to primarily satisfy irrigation purposes.

See also

List of power stations in Tasmania

References

External links

Huntsman Lake page on Tas Fish

Dams completed in 2007
Energy infrastructure completed in 2008
Hydroelectric power stations in Tasmania
Dams in Tasmania
Gravity dams
Roller-compacted concrete dams
Meander Valley Council